Kekkar or Kekkaru is a village in Honnavar Taluk, Uttara Kannada district, Karnataka, India. There is a branch of Ramachandrapura Mutt in the village.

References  

Villages in Uttara Kannada district